The following is a list of stadiums in Central America and the Caribbean with a capacity of at least 10,000.

Stadiums in Central America and the Caribbean

Indoor stadiums in Central America and the Caribbean 

The following is a list of stadiums in Central America and the Caribbean.

List

Anguilla
Webster Park, The Valley

Antigua and Barbuda
Antigua Recreation Ground – Saint John's
Police Ground – Saint George
Sir Vivian Richards Stadium – Cricket Stadium
Stanford Cricket Ground – Cricket Stadium

Aruba
soccer:

Guillermo Prospero Trinidad Stadion – Oranjestad
Compleho Deportivo Frans Figaroa – Noord

baseball:
Don Elias Mansur Ballpark – Oranjestad
Joe Laveist Sport Park – Sint Nicolaas

Bahamas
Thomas Robinson Stadium – Nassau

Barbados
Barbados National Stadium (outdoor running track) – Waterford, Saint Michael (Bridgetown)
Garrison Savannah (horse racing) – Garrison Historic Area, Saint Michael (Bridgetown)
Kensington Oval (cricket) – Fontabelle, Saint Michael (Bridgetown)
Wildey Gymnasium (indoor facility) – Wildey, Saint Michael
3Ws Oval- Cricket

Belize
Estadio Carl Ramos – Dangriga
Marion Jones Sports Complex – Belize City
Norman Broaster Stadium – San Ignacio
Orange Walk People's Stadium – Orange Walk
FFB Field – Belmopan

British Virgin Islands
Sherly Ground – Road Town

Cayman Islands
Truman Boden Stadium – George Town

Costa Rica
Estadio Alejandro Morera Soto – Alajuela
Estadio Carlos Alvarado – Santa Bárbara (canton), Heredia Province
Estadio Carlos Ugalde Álvarez – San Carlos (canton)
Estadio Ebal Rodríguez – Guápiles, Limón
Estadio Edgardo Baltodano Briceño – Liberia, Guanacaste
Estadio Eladio Rosabal Cordero – Heredia
Estadio Guillermo Vargas Roldán – Alajuela
Estadio Municipal Miguel "Lito" Pérez – Puntarenas
Estadio Nacional – La Sabana, San José
Estadio Ricardo Saprissa Aymá – Tibás
Estadio Juan Gobán – Puerto Limón, Limón
Estadio José Rafael Fello Meza Ivankovich – Cartago
Jorge Hernán "Cuty" Monge Stadium – Desamparados
Estadio Municipal Pérez Zeledón – San Isidro de El General

Cuba
Calixto García Íñiguez Stadium – Holguín
Cinco de Septiembre Stadium – Cienfuegos
Estadio Augusto César Sandino – Santa Clara
Estadio Cándido González – Camagüey
Estadio Capitán San Luis – Pinar del Río
Estadio Guillermón Moncada – Santiago de Cuba
Estadio Latinoamericano – Havana
Estadio Panamericano – Havana
Estadio Pedro Marrero – Havana
Estadio Universitario Juan Abrantes – Havana
José Antonio Huelga Stadium – Sancti Spíritus
José Ramón Cepero Stadium – Ciego de Ávila
Mártires de Barbados Stadium – Bayamo
Nguyen Van Troi Stadium – Guantánamo
Victoria de Girón Stadium – Matanzas

Dominica
Windsor Park – Roseau

Dominican Republic
Estadio Cibao – Santiago
Estadio Francisco Micheli – La Romana
Estadio Julian Javier – San Francisco de Macorís
Estadio La Barranquita – Santiago
Estadio Olímpico – La Vega
Estadio Olímpico Félix Sánchez – Santo Domingo
Estadio Quisqueya – Santo Domingo
Estadio Tetelo Vargas – San Pedro de Macorís
Palacio de los Deportes Virgilio Travieso Soto – Santo Domingo
Puerto Bani Stadium – Puerto Bani

El Salvador
Estadio Anna Mercedes Campos – Sonsonate
Estadio Correcaminos – San Francisco Gotera
Estadio Cuscatlán – San Salvador
Estadio España – Soyapango, San Salvador
Estadio Hanz Usko – La Libertad
Estadio Jorge Calero Suárez – Metapán
Estadio Jorge "Mágico" González – San Salvador
Estadio José Gregorio Martínez – Chalatenango
Estadio Juan Francisco Barraza – San Miguel
Estadio Las Delicias – Santa Tecla
Estadio Mauricio Vides – Ilobasco
Estadio Oscar Quiteño – Santa Ana
Estadio Sergio Torres
Estadio Universitario UES – UES-San Salvador
Estadio Victoria Gasteiz – Nejapa, San Salvador

Grenada
Cricket National Stadium – Saint George's
Grenada National Stadium – Saint George's
Queen's Park – Saint George's

Guadeloupe
Stade René Serge Nabajoth – Les Abymes
Stade St. Claude – Basse-Terre
Stade de Riviere des Pères
Vélodrome Amédée Detreaux
Stade Municipal de Vieux-Habitants

Guatemala
Estadio Armando Barillas – Escuintla
Estadio Carlos Salazar Hijo – Mazatenango
Estadio David Ordoñez Bardales – Zacapa
Estadio del Ejército – Guatemala City
Estadio Del Monte – Bananera
Estadio El Trébol – Guatemala City
Estadio Kaibil Balam – Huehuetenango
Estadio La Asunción – Asunción Mita
Estadio La Pedrera – Guatemala City
Estadio Las Flores – Jalapa
Estadio Las Victorias – Chiquimula
Estadio Mariano Galvez – Santa Lucía Cotzumalguapa
Estadio Mario Camposeco – Quetzaltenango
Estadio Marquesa de la Ensenada – San Marcos
Estadio Mateo Flores – Guatemala City
Estadio Municipal Amatitlán – Amatitlán
Estadio Pensativo – Antigua Guatemala
Estadio Roy Fearon – Puerto Barrios
Estadio Verapaz – Coban
Estadio Winston Pineda (El Cóndor) – Escuintla

Haiti
Stade Sylvio Cator – Port-au-Prince

Honduras
Estadio Argelio Sabillon – Santa Bárbara
Estadio Carlos Miranda – Comayagua
Estadio Excelsior – Puerto Cortés
Estadio Fausto Flores Lagos – Choluteca
Estadio Francisco Morazán – San Pedro Sula
Estadio Humberto Micheletti – El Progreso
Estadio León Gómez – Tela Timsa
Estadio Marcelo Tinoco – Danlí, El Paraíso
Estadio Miraflores – Santa Rosa de Copán
Estadio Nilmo Edwards – La Ceiba
Estadio Olímpico Metropolitano – San Pedro Sula
Estadio Roberto Martínez Ávila – Siguatepeque
Estadio Roberto Suazo Cordoba – La Paz
Estadio Rubén Guifarro – Catacamas
Estadio San Jorge – Olanchito
Estadio Tiburcio Carías Andino – Tegucigalpa
Estadio Yankel Rosenthal – San Pedro Sula

Jamaica
Elleston Wakeland Stadium – Falmouth
Emmett Park – Kingston
Ferdi Neita Sports Complex – Portmore
Frome Sports Club – Savanna-la-Mar
Greenfield Stadium – Trelawny
Harbour View Stadium – Kingston
Independence Park – Kingston
Prison Oval – Spanish Town
Railway Oval – Kingston
Sabina Park – Kingston

Martinique
Stade d'Honneur – Fort-de-France
Stade Louis Achille – Fort-de-France
Stade Omnisports (Lamentin) – Lamentin

Montserrat
Blakes Estate Stadium – Plymouth

Curaçao

Bonaire
Kralendijk Municipal Stadion – Kralendijk
Stadion Antonio Trenidat – Rincon

Curaçao
Stadion Antoin Maduro – Willemstad
Stadion Ergilio Hato – Willemstad

Nicaragua
Estadio Cacique Diriangén – Diriamba
Estadio Glorias Costeñas – Bluefields
Estadio Independencia – Estelí
Estadio Nacional Dennis Martínez – Managua
Estadio Olímpico de San Marcos – San Marcos

Panama
Estadio Agustín Sánchez – La Chorrera
Estadio Armando Dely Valdés – Colón
Estadio Javier Cruz 'Artes y Oficios' – Panama City
Estadio Kenny Sarracín – David
Estadio Nacional de Panamá – Panama City
Estadio Rommel Fernández – Panama City
Toco Castillo – Santiago de Veraguas
Estadio Virgilio Tejeira – Penonomé, Coclé
Estadio Bernardo Gil – San Miguelito, Panamá
Estadio Camping Resort – Chilibre
Estadio Municipal de Balboa – Balboa
Estadio San Cristóbal – David

Puerto Rico
Mayagüez Athletics Stadium – Mayaguez
Coliseo Manuel Iguina – Arecibo
Coliseo Rubén Rodríguez – Bayamón
El Nuevo Comandante – Canóvanas
Estadio Hiram Bithorn – San Juan
Estadio Sixto Escobar – San Juan
José Miguel Agrelot Coliseum – San Juan
Juan Pachín Vicéns Auditorium – Ponce
Juan Ramón Loubriel Stadium – Bayamón
Parque Yldefonso Solá Morales – Caguas

St. Kitts and Nevis
Elquemedo Willett Park – Charlestown, Nevis
Warner Park Sporting Complex – Basseterre, Saint Kitts

St. Lucia
Daren Sammy Cricket Ground – Gros Islet
Bones Park – Castries
Mindoo Philip Park – Castries
Vieux Fort National Stadium – Vieux Fort Quarter

Saint Martin
Stade Alberic Richards – Saint Martin

Saint Vincent and the Grenadines
Arnos Vale Sports Complex, Arnos Vale
Victoria Park, Kingstown

Trinidad and Tobago
Ato Boldon Stadium – Couva
Dwight Yorke Stadium – Bacolet (Tobago)
Hasely Crawford Stadium – Port of Spain
Larry Gomes Stadium – Malabar
Manny Ramjohn Stadium – Marabella (San Fernando)
Marvin Lee Stadium – Macoya
Queen's Park Oval – Port-of-Spain
Brian Lara Stadium – Tarouba
Sir Frank Worrell Memorial Ground – Saint Augustine
Sangre Grande Regional Complex – Sangre Grande
Palo Seco Velodrome – Palo Seco
Guaracara Park – Pointe-à-Pierre

Turks & Caicos
TCIFA National Academy – Providenciales

United States Virgin Islands
Lionel Roberts Park – St. Thomas

See also
List of stadiums in Africa
List of stadiums in Asia
List of stadiums in Europe
List of stadiums in North America
List of stadiums in Oceania
List of stadiums in South America
List of North American stadiums by capacity

References

External links 
Atlas of worldwide soccer stadiums for GoogleEarth ***NEW***
worldstadiums 
cafe.daum.net/stade
Football Stadiums
Football Temples of the World

Caribbean-related lists
Central America-related lists
Lists of buildings and structures in Central America
Lists of buildings and structures in the Caribbean 
Central America

Sports venues in Central America
Central America and the Caribbean